C. J. Lyons aka Cat Lyons is an American physician and writer of medical suspense novels.

Biography 
Lyons was raised in the Pennsylvania municipality known as State College, and attended medical school at the University of Florida. She did her internship and residency at UPMC Children's Hospital of Pittsburgh, followed by a fellowship in Pediatric Emergency Medicine at Akron Children's Hospital. She has held teaching appointments at the Medical College of Ohio and the Penn State Milton S. Hershey Medical Center. She worked as a general pediatrician focusing on community health care.

In 2008 she published Snake Skin which includes the hero Lucy Guardino who is a Pittsburgh Soccer mum who is employed by the FBI in their Sexual Assault Felony Enforcement Squad. Further books in that series include Bloodstained and Kill Zone.

Bibliography 
Lucy Guardino Series:
 Snake Skin
 Blood Stained
 Kill Zone
 Hard Fall

Renegade Justice Series:
 Fight Dirty
 Raw Edges
 Angels Weep
 Look Away
 Trip Wire

Hart and Drake Series:
 Nerves of Steel
 Sleight of Hand
 Face to Face
 Eye of the Storm

Caitlyn Tierney Series:
 Blind Faith. Minotaur Books, 2012. .
 Black Sheep. Minotaur Books, 2013. .
 Hollow Bones. Minotaur Books, 2013. .

Angels of Mercy Series:
 Lifelines. Berkley Books, 2008. .
 Warning Signs. Berkley Books, 2009. .
 Urgent Care
 Critical Condition

Beacon Falls Series:
 Last Light
 Devil Smoke
 Open Grave
 Gone Dark
 Bitter Truth

Shadow Ops Series:
 Chasing Shadows
 Lost in Shadows
 Edge of Shadows

Fatal Insomnia Series:
 Farewell to Dreams
 A Raging Dawn
 The Sleepless Stars

Tombstone Digs Series:
 In Memory

Awards
 Romance Writers of America, Golden Heart Finalist in Romantic Suspense, 2004
 From The Heart Romance Writers of America, Winner of Golden Gateway Contest in Romantic Suspense

References

American women writers
University of Florida alumni
University of Toledo faculty
Living people
Year of birth missing (living people)
American women academics
21st-century American women